Justice Prakash Chandra Tatia is a former Chief Justice of the Rajasthan High Court. He was a judge of Rajasthan High Court and after Delhi High Court.

He currently holds the position of Chairman of the Rajasthan Human Rights Commission and is working towards banning live-in relationships in India, with the claim that they are tantamount to "social terrorism" and that the status of women who were 'abandoned' after live-in relationships was worse than that of divorced women. He supports “intense awareness campaigns” to inform women to stay away from live-in relationships.
He resigned from the post of chairman of Rajasthan Human Rights Commission on 25 November 2019 citing health and family reasons.

References

Judges of the Rajasthan High Court
Judges of the Delhi High Court
Chief Justices of the Jharkhand High Court
20th-century Indian judges